JC Vickery is a British consumer goods company founded in 1890 in London, UK.

Early history

John Collard Vickery and his then partner, Arthur Thomas Hobbs, bought up the long established business of William Griggs, a stationer and bookseller at 183, Regent Street in c.1890. William Griggs had been at 183 Regent street as early as 1843 and 1854. When they took over they expanded the stock to include jewellery, dressing cases, gold and silver lines.

Continuing alone after 1891, Vickery extended his premises in 1900 to 179, 181 and 183 Regent Street, with showrooms to the rear at 1 New Burlington Place.

Merchandise

Goldsmith, silversmith, jeweller, dressing case and fitted travelling bag manufacturer, watch and clock importer, and more.

Royal warrants

JC Vickery obtained the following royal warrants:

HM the King, HM the Queen, HM Queen Alexandra, TRH the Prince and Princess of Wales, HM the King of Portugal, HM the King of Spain, TM the King and Queen of Denmark, HM the Queen of Norway, HM the King of Sweden, and Prince and Princess Christian of Schleswig Holstein.

Post 1930

The business was acquired by James Walker Ltd in the 1930s.

John Culme in his 'Directory of Gold & Silversmiths' relates a story regarding Vickery: "Shortly before his death, the late G. S. Saunders of James Walker Ltd., told me that J. C. Vickery's business reached the height of its success before the First World War. Vickery, who would travel each day from Streatham to Regent Street in his own carriage, stopped his coachman one day in order to examine a leaf on the drive outside his house. Stepping down from the vehicle he picked up the leaf to pin to it a note. As he continued his journey his gardeners were astonished to read 'Why has this leaf been here for two days?'"

References

Defunct companies based in London
Luxury brands
Bags (fashion)
British brands
Retail companies based in London
Retail companies established in 1890
Retail buildings in London
British Royal Warrant holders
Shops in London
Jewellery retailers of the United Kingdom
Jewellers
Silversmiths
1890 establishments in England